The Live Lounge is a segment on the British radio stations BBC Radio 1 and BBC Radio 1Xtra. It was originally hosted by Simon Mayo, and later by Jo Whiley on her weekday mid-morning, and later weekend lunchtime radio shows, then by Fearne Cotton from 2009 until 2015, and then by Clara Amfo from May 2015 to August 2021. Since September 2021 the segment is now hosted by Rickie Haywood-Williams, Melvin Odoom and Charlie Hedges.

It exhibits well-known artists usually performing one song of their own and one by another artist, in an acoustic format. The Live Lounge itself is also a physical room in the Radio 1 studios, from where some of the performances are broadcast; however, due to its size, many are done from the BBC Maida Vale Studios. From 2009, Trevor Nelson began hosting Live Lounges on his BBC Radio 1Xtra show, and was replaced in that slot by DJ Ace in 2017.

The songs chosen as cover versions are often a completely different genre to that which the artist usually performs, and offer a new perspective on the original. Jamie Cullum's cover of Pharrell Williams's "Frontin' led to Cullum being signed to Pharrell's label Star Trak when played to him at a later visit to The Jo Whiley Show, and was added to his 2003 album Twentysomething.

Performances and albums

Live Lounge Features
Over the years of Live Lounge, various Radio 1 features have involved this segment, these include:
Live Lounge Tour
Ultimate Live Lounge
Live Lounge of 2010
A-Z of the Live Lounge
List of Live Lounge cover versions

References

External links